The National Airlines Council of Canada is a trade association representing Canada's four largest passenger air carriers. It was founded by Air Canada, Jazz Air LP, WestJet and Air Transat, and officially incorporated on September 4, 2008.

External links
National Airlines Council of Canada

Airlines of Canada